Stefan Thurnbichler (born 2 March 1984) is an Austrian former ski jumper who competed from 2000 to 2011. He won the Continental Cup three times, but was not a regular competitor at World Cup level. On 20 Mar 2003 in Planica, Thurnbichler achieved a personal best jump of 224 metres, only a metre short of the world record at the time. In 2009 he was part of the Austrian team in the World Cup and often placed in the top 10.

References

1984 births
Austrian male ski jumpers
Living people
Sportspeople from Innsbruck